Warren Ridge is a SW-NE ridge 2 nautical miles (3.7 km) long on the north slope of Kyle Hills, Ross Island. The ridge rises to c.1100 m at the southwest end and culminates in Dibble Peak, 1 nautical mile (1.9 km) north of Ainley Peak. Named by Advisory Committee on Antarctic Names (US-ACAN) (2000) after Stephen G. Warren, Department of Atmospheric Sciences, University of Washington, Seattle, who worked several summer seasons with United States Antarctic Program (USAP) and ANARE (Australian National Antarctic Research Expeditions) from 1985; investigated climate processes on the Antarctic plateau in four deployments to South Pole Station, including the full year of 1992 as station science leader.

Ridges of Ross Island